is a Japanese shōjo manga written and illustrated by Izumi Tsubaki. It was serialised in Hana to Yume magazine and collected into nine bound volume by Hakusensha between 2004 and 2007. It is licensed in North America by Viz Media, which released the first volume of the manga on February 3, 2009 and the final volume on August 3, 2010.  It is licensed in French by Akata, which is releasing the manga as Sweet Relax.

Plot
Chiaki Togu is a shy first year high school student who is the star of her high school's Massage Research Society club. She falls in love at the sight of the back of Yosuke, who is considered the most attractive boy at her school. Although Yosuke seems out of Chiaki's league, she would do anything to give him a massage. The two eventually strike up a deal in which she will be allowed to touch his back if she can make him fall in love with her.

Media

Manga

Reception

Casey Brienza, writing for Anime News Network, described the manga as "the single worst concept and the single worst execution of a shōjo manga serial that this reviewer can recall seeing since the start of her reviewing career". Melinda Beasi, reviewing the first volume, noted that the plot complications were resolved too easily. Jennifer Dunbar felt that the fourth volume was full of "shōjo stereotypes", and noted that it was unusual that the fifth volume's primary focus was on massage. Dunbar enjoyed the portrayal of the massage school. Katherine Dacey felt the story was "bland". Ysabet Reinhardt MacFarlane felt that Chiaki's evil twin sister was "cringe-worthy". Jason Thompson, writing for the appendix to Manga: The Complete Guide, felt the manga was extremely unrealistic, and "too dumb to even be a guilty pleasure".

References

External links
 

2004 manga
Comedy anime and manga
Hakusensha manga
Romance anime and manga
Viz Media manga